The 1939 Soviet Census, conducted from January 17 to January 26, succeeded the Soviet Census of 1937 that was declared invalid. It happened only two years after the previous census, due to the failure of the preceding one.

Preparation 
The census took place after the postponement of the 1930 census to first 1945 and then 1937, followed by the failure of that census. In preparation for the 1939 census, a number of decisions were made to avoid ending with the same fate as the census of 1937. Due to the previous census showing believers in religion to form a majority among the population, the question on religion was dropped from the census entirely, and the occupation of priest was changed to "servitor of a cult" in the census forms. Additionally, as many of the people in charge of organizing the previous census had been removed from their positions,  and Vyacheslav Molotov were put in charge of managing it.

Census 
The census-taking started on January 17, ending on January 23 in urban areas and January 26 in rural areas. It form contained sixteen questions and was printed in twenty-two languages, as well as providing, for the first and only time, a way to count both convicted criminals and political detainees. While follow-up checks and several other new tabulation methods were instituted, forms were not issued to keep track of double counting. A total of 400,000 census takers were sent to facilitate census-taking over the country. There were some reports of various religious communities resisting the census, which were dealt with by use of legal means.

Aftermath 
Within four months of it being taken, the preliminary census results were released. For unknown reasons, the full results were never made public. While initially the census was viewed inside the USSR as a "model census", it later became clear that large-scale manipulation of the census results took place, leading to intensive study and criticism. Accidental over-counting and under-counting were rampant issues, along with deliberate falsification with the goal of obscuring population loss and meeting Stalin's stated goal of the population reaching 170 million. That claim of 170 million is estimated to have been inflated by around 3,000,000 people, or 1.8%. Analysis of the results from the Kazakh SSR especially shows this, in which serious distortions of the ethnic Kazakh population took place in an attempt to conceal population losses from the Kazakh famines of the 1920s and 30s. Historians have claimed that all the issues with fudged numbers and mistakes discredit the census as a reliable source. The Soviet leadership eventually learned from the mistakes made, and Vladimir Starovsky, head of the Central Statistical Directorate, corrected the points that led to accidental miscounts in the 1939 and 1937 censuses for the census of 1959, leading to a reliable count being taken.

Results 
According to the official results, the total population of the USSR was found to be at 170,467,186. The urban population more than doubled, from 26.3 million in 1926, to 55.9 million in 1939, while the literacy rate rose from 51.1% to 81.2% in the same time frame. Such a rapid rate of urbanization was historically unprecedented at the time.

The 5 largest nationalities in the USSR were found to be Russians, Ukrainians, Belarusians, Uzbeks, and Tatars.

References

Further reading 
All-Union census of the population of 1939: National composition of the population by republics of the USSR (in Russian)

1939 in the Soviet Union
Censuses in the Soviet Union